Pippen is a surname.  People with the name include:

Cotton Pippen (1911–1981), American baseball player
Danny Pippen (born 1997), American basketball player
Kavion Pippen (born 1996), American basketball player
Larsa Pippen (born 1974), American reality television personality
Lovetta Pippen (21st century), American singer
Scottie Pippen (born 1965), American basketball player
Scotty Pippen Jr. (born 2000), son of the above; American basketball player

See also
Pippin (name), given name and surname

English-language surnames